Maite Oroz Areta (born 25 March 1998) is a Spanish professional footballer who plays as a midfielder for Liga F club Real Madrid CF and the Spain women's national team. She made her senior club debut with Athletic Club in 2015 and departed in 2020.

Club career
Born in Huarte, Navarre, Oroz began playing football with boys in the village team CD Huarte from the age of 6, joining the youth system at Osasuna in nearby Pamplona aged 12. From that early age, she was marked out as a promising talent due to her skill on the ball, creativity and confidence. She played  with Osasuna's senior team for a season in the Segunda División before the women's section of the club was disbanded in 2014, leading her to join Athletic Club.

Following a year with the club's B-team, she made her senior team debut in September 2015 and became a regular from then on, making 30 appearances in the 2015–16 Primera División as Athletic finished as champions. She played and scored in the subsequent 2016–17 UEFA Champions League, but the club did not progress beyond the opening knockout round.

In September 2018, Oroz sustained a serious injury, rupturing the anterior cruciate ligament of her left knee during a league match against Atlético Madrid (one of several such injuries suffered by players in Athletic's various teams over a short period) which ruled her out for the entire 2018–19 season. Along with teammate and friend Damaris Egurrola, she decided to leave the club when her contract expired in summer 2020. In July 2020, after she had already agreed to join Real Madrid Femenino, a court case regarding the legality of 'compensation lists' for players in Spanish women's football confirmed that her new employers would not have to pay a fee to Athletic Club.

International career
Oroz was involved with Spanish national age-group teams at several levels and with much success, being a member of the under-17 squad that claimed the bronze medal at the 2013 UEFA Women's Under-17 Championship, silver at the 2014 FIFA U-17 Women's World Cup and gold at the 2015 UEFA Women's Under-17 Championship; the under-19 squad which reached the final of the 2016 UEFA Women's Under-19 Championship then won the 2017 tournament; and the under-20 squad who were runners-up at the 2018 FIFA U-20 Women's World Cup, having also been involved in the 2016 edition.

In October 2019, she was called up to the inaugural squad for España Promesas (essentially Spain B), along with two clubmates.

She has also played for the unofficial Basque Country and Navarre representative teams, making her debut for both in 2017.

International goals

References

External links

Living people
1998 births
Spanish women's footballers
Footballers from Navarre
Women's association football midfielders
People from Cuenca de Pamplona
Athletic Club Femenino players
Primera División (women) players
Real Madrid Femenino players
Spain women's international footballers
Athletic Club Femenino B players
CA Osasuna Femenino players
Spain women's youth international footballers
21st-century Spanish women